Isomorphism or isomorph may refer to:

 Isomorphism, in mathematics, logic, philosophy, and information theory, a mapping that preserves the structure of the mapped entities, in particular:
 Graph isomorphism a mapping that preserves the edges and vertices of a graph
 Group isomorphism a mapping that preserves the group structure
 Order isomorphism a mapping that preserves the comparabilities of a partially ordered set.
 Ring isomorphism a mapping that preserves both the additive and multiplicative structure of a ring
 Isomorphism theorems theorems that assert that some homomorphisms involving quotients and subobjects are isomorphisms
 Isomorphism (sociology), a similarity of the processes or structure of one organization to those of another
 Isomorphism (crystallography), a similarity of crystal form
 Isomorphism (Gestalt psychology), a correspondence between a stimulus array and the brain state created by that stimulus
 Cybernetic isomorphism, a recursive property of viable systems, as defined in Stafford Beer's viable system model
 Isomorph (gene), a classification of gene mutation

See also
Isomorph Records, a British music label